The 2002 Vuelta a Castilla y León was the 17th edition of the Vuelta a Castilla y León cycle race and was held on 2 May to 6 May 2002. The race started in Ávila and finished in Benavente. The race was won by Juan Miguel Mercado.

General classification

References

Vuelta a Castilla y León
Vuelta a Castilla y León by year
2002 in Spanish sport